Mari is an endangered Sepik language spoken in East Sepik Province, Papua New Guinea.

Mari is not used by many children. Although Mari is a language known only by approximately eighty people, it is spoken only within the home. It is spoken in Mari village of Gawi Rural LLG, East Sepik Province.

Recordings of scriptures in the tongue of Mari can be found on the website of the Global Recordings Network, a non-profit organization dedicated to translating Biblical canon and songs into endangered languages and dialects in audio format.

References

Bahinemo languages
Languages of East Sepik Province
Endangered Papuan languages